Lucas Barbosa Gil (born May 15, 1984) is a Brazilian male model and Mister Brazil World 2007. He represented Brazil to attend Mister World 2007 pageant on March 31, 2007, in Sanya, People's Republic of China and won the first Runner up. Later, he attended International Man 2007 contest on November 18, 2007 was held in Bali, Indonesia and won the second Runner up.

Early life and education
Lucas Gil is from Votuporanga, an inner city of São Paulo, Brazil. He completed a degree in Nutrition, but changed career direction when he entered and won the 2007 "Mr Brazil" beauty contest. He then went to "Mr World" where he was proclaimed first runner up and started to represent his country around the world.

Modeling
Off the back of his success in modelling he was able to move to New York in 2009 to focus on his career as a runway model. His first job there was a photoshoot for "Brazilian Vogue" via Boss Models. He then went on to appear on the cover of Men's Health. Soon after winning, he appeared in a commercial for Colgate and Pepsi. He also appeared in different local and international brand campaigns such as Lupo, Rounderbum, Estivanelli, Raphael Steffens, Adidas, and Calvin Klein.

Career
Besides from his successful venture in the modelling industry, he is also dedicated in influencing others and became a co-founder of Mahamudra Brasil which goal is to extract the best from each person regardless of who they are. Among the co-founders is his fellow Mister Brazil (2010) titleholder Jonas Sulzbach.

References
https://web.archive.org/web/20141102102356/http://www.mostbeautifulman.com/misc/LucasGil/bio.shtml 
http://www.bellazon.com/main/topic/51858-lucas-gil/
http://lhommedujour2020.blogspot.com/2011/10/lucas-gil.html

External links
Lucas Gil's Instagram page

1984 births
Living people
People from Votuporanga
Brazilian male models